Hélder António Freitas Noverça (born 18 December 1970) is a retired Angolan-born Portuguese football midfielder.

References

1970 births
Living people
Portuguese footballers
Leixões S.C. players
F.C. Tirsense players
C.D. Aves players
Leça F.C. players
F.C. Penafiel players
Gil Vicente F.C. players
Associação Naval 1º de Maio players
S.C. Espinho players
Association football midfielders
Primeira Liga players
C.F. Fão players